Yokosuka Research Park (YRP) is an area in Yokosuka City, Japan, where many of the wireless, mobile communications related companies have set up their research and development centers and joint testing facilities.

YRP was constructed during the 1990s near to NTT's Yokosuka Research & Development Center.

Transportation
YRP is located in Hikari no Oka, Yokosuka City, about 90 minutes by train from central Tokyo.  However, there are express through trains with significantly faster access.  It is served by YRP Nobi Station on the Keikyu Kurihama Line, with direct services from Shinagawa in Tokyo.

History
July, 1987: The YRP Planning Group was established
March, 1994: The "Infrastructure Construction" Project was started
October, 1997: No. 1, No. 2 and Life Support Buildings were completed

Major companies based in the park
NTT Docomo
Panasonic
NEC
Oki Electric Industry
Denso
Hitachi Ltd.
Mitsubishi Electric
Toshiba
KDDI
Sharp Corporation
Texas Instruments
Sony Ericsson
Fujitsu
Air Liquide
National Institute of Information and Communications Technology (NICT), Japan

Major buildings and facilities
YRP Centers Nos. 1, 2 and 3
YRP Venture Building
YRP Bldg. No 5 (Fujitsu)
NTT Yokosuka R&D Center
Optowave Laboratory
NTT Docomo R&D Center
Panasonic Mobile Communications' YRP Laboratory
Yokosuka ITS Research Center
NEC's YRP Technical Center
Cafeterias: Roseteria 1 and 2
Dormitory for Singles
The Hotel YRP
Mobile Communications Testing Facilities

Gallery

See also
 Kansai Science City, Japan
 Silicon Valley, U.S.A.
 Zhongguancun, High Tech Zones and Software Parks (such as Dalian Software Park), China
 List of technology centers of the World

External links
 

Science parks in Japan
Buildings and structures in Yokosuka, Kanagawa